Brooker's merocyanine (1-methyl-4-[(oxocyclohexadienylidene)ethylidene]-1,4-dihydropyridine, MOED) is an organic dye belonging to the class of merocyanines.

MOED is notable for its solvatochromic properties, meaning it changes color depending on the solvent in which it is dissolved.

As shown in the structural formula, MOED can be depicted using two resonance structures: neutral and zwitterionic. Research indicates that the zwitterionic structure is the major contributor to resonance hybrid when the compound exists in polar solvents such as water, and the neutral form when it exists in nonpolar solvents such as chloroform.

Solvatochromic effects
When MOED is dissolved in various liquids, its colour will vary, depending on the solvent and its polarity. In general, the more polar the solvent, the shorter the wavelengths of the light absorbed will be, this is referred to as a hypsochromic shift. When light of a certain colour (wavelength) is absorbed, the solution will appear in the complementary colour of the one absorbed. Therefore, in water, a highly polar solvent, MOED appears yellow (corresponding to absorbed blue light of wavelengths 435–480 nm), but is purple or blue (corresponding to absorbed green to yellow light of wavelengths 560–595 nm) in acetone, a less polar solvent.

The effect stems in part from the stabilization of the ground state of the merocyanine molecule in polar solvents, which increases the energy gap between the ground state and excited states, which corresponds to shorter wavelengths (increased energy) of the absorbed light. Similarly, protic and aprotic solvents also affect MOED in solution differently. Solvents that are hydrogen donors (i.e. water, acids), will affect the visible absorption spectra by engaging in hydrogen bonding or donating the hydrogen outright, making the molecule favor the zwitterionic resonance form; an example of this may be seen in the picture where acetic acid, though less polar than water, was able to produce a more yellow solution.

Uses
Because of its solvatochromic properties MOED, and solvatochromic dyes in general, are useful as solvent polarity indicators, and for creating solutions that absorb light at a specific frequency. Additional potential areas of use include pH sensors and transition metal cation indicators. Further uses of MOED includes the production of certain photosensitive materials. Research into merocyanine dyes is ongoing.

Synthesis
Brooker's merocyanine can be prepared beginning with the methylation of 4-methylpyridine to produce 1,4-dimethylpyridinium iodide. Base catalyzed reaction with 4-hydroxybenzaldehyde and subsequent intramolecular dehydration provides Brooker's merocyanine.

Notes

References
 M J Minch and S Sadiq Shah: "Spectroscopic studies of hydrophobic association. Merocyanine dyes in cationic and anionic micelles". Journal of Organic Chemistry, 44:3252, 1979.
Amaresh Mishra, et al.: "Cyanines during the 1990s: A Review", Chemical Reviews, 2000, 100 (6), 1973-2012 • 
Christian Reichardt: "Solvatochromic Dyes as Solvent Polarity Indicators", Chem. Rev., 1994, 94 (8), 2319-2358 • 
S. J. Davidson2 and W. P. Jencks: "The Effect of Concentrated Salt Solutions on a Merocyanine Dye, a Vinylogous Amide", Journal of the American Chemical Society,1969, 91 (2), 225-234 • 
Brooker, Keyes, et al.: "Studies in the Cyanine Dye Series. XI. The Merocyanines", J. Am. Chem. Soc., 1951, 73 (11), 5326-5332 • 
Brooker, Keyes, et al.: "Color and Constitution. XI.1 Anhydronium Bases of p-Hydroxystyryl Dyes as Solvent Polarity Indicators", J. Am. Chem. Soc., 1951, 73 (11), 5350-5356 • 
Mohamed K. Awad and Shakir T. Abdel-Halim: "Mechanism of Water Attacking on Brooker’s Merocyanine Dye and Its Effect on the Molecular and Electronic Structures: Theoretical Study", Bull. Chem. Soc. Jpn. Vol. 79, No. 6, 838–844 (2006)
H.S. Freeman and S.A. McIntosh, "Some Interesting Substituent Effects in Merocyanine Dyes", Educ. in Chem., 27(3) 79(1990).

Dyes
Pyridines